The Juror is a 1996 American legal thriller film based on the 1995 novel by George Dawes Green. It was directed by Brian Gibson and stars Demi Moore as a single mother picked for jury duty for a mafia trial and Alec Baldwin as a mobster sent to intimidate her. The film received highly negative reviews and Moore won a joint Golden Raspberry Award for Worst Actress for both her performance in this film and in Striptease.

Plot
Annie Laird is a sculptor who lives in New York with her son Oliver; she works a day job as a data entry clerk. Annie is selected to be a juror in the trial of mafia boss Louie Boffano, who is accused of ordering the murder of Salvatore Riggio.

Mark Cordell buys some of Annie's artwork and then wines and dines her before she discovers he is better known as "The Teacher", Boffano's enforcer and the actual perpetrator of Riggio's murder. Mark tells Annie to persuade the jury to acquit Boffano, or she and Oliver will die.

A frightened Annie convinces the jury to acquit Boffano. After the trial, Boffano questions whether Annie should "disappear", seeing her as a loose end. Mark convinces Boffano otherwise. Mark goes after Annie's friend Juliet. After having sex with her, Mark reveals himself to be Annie's stalker. He pulls a gun and forces Juliet to take a fatal drug overdose. Mark boasts of Juliet's murder to Eddie, who also works for Boffano but unlike Mark, is sympathetic to Annie as he is a parent himself.

To ensure her son's safety, Annie hides Oliver in the village of T'ui Cuch, Guatemala. The prosecutor, who figured out Annie was threatened, wants Annie to turn state's witness so they can go after Mark, who now plans to take over Boffano's empire.

Annie convinces the prosecutor to let her wear a wire in a scheduled meeting with Mark. Annie removes the wire and gives it to Eddie, insinuating she and Mark are now a couple. Annie then succeeds in getting Mark to incriminate himself in a boastful rant about his ambitions, which she tapes on a hidden tape recorder. She uses the tape to tip off Boffano, who schedules a meeting with Mark.

Boffano's plan backfires when Mark kills both Boffano and his son Joseph, along with their henchmen. He also slashes Eddie's throat. Mark, furious at Annie's betrayal, calls her, revealing his intention to travel to Guatemala to kill Oliver.

Annie travels to Guatemala where there is a showdown with Mark. He chases Oliver into a structure, where locals shoot Mark. Annie, also armed with a pistol, fires six more shots, making sure Mark is dead after he tries to shoot Annie with a gun pulled from his ankle holster. Oliver is unharmed.

Cast
 Demi Moore as Annie Laird
 Alec Baldwin as Vincent "The Teacher" / Mark Cordell
 James Gandolfini as Eddie
 Joseph Gordon-Levitt as Oliver Laird
 Lindsay Crouse as US Attorney Tallow
 Anne Heche as Juliet
 Tony Lo Bianco as Louie Boffano
 Michael Rispoli as Joseph Boffano
 Matthew Cowles as Rodney
 Matt Craven as Boone
 Frank Adonis as DeCicco
 Michael Constantine as Judge Weitzel
 Polly Adams as Jury Forewoman
 Jack Gilpin as Accountant, Juror
 Chuck Cooper as Stockbroker, Juror
 Charle Landry as Musician, Juror
 Tom Signorelli as Locksmith, Juror
 Frances Foster as Housewife, Juror
 Robin Moseley as Matron, Juror
 Julie Halston as Inez
 Todd Susman as Boezman
 Rosemary De Angelis as Mrs. Riggio
 Joe Perrino as Tommy Riggio
 James McCauley as Carew
 William Hill as Walters  
 Chuck Zito as Frankie

Production
Columbia Pictures acquired the movie rights to the unpublished book for $1.5 million. They then paid Ted Tally over $1 million to write the screenplay.

Reception

Critical response
The Juror was a critical failure. It holds a 22% approval rating on Rotten Tomatoes based on 23 reviews, with an average rating of 4.5/10. The site's consensus states: "Self-serious despite its abundance of trite twists, The Juror is a drab thriller that audiences may hold in contempt." Moore won a joint Razzie Award for Worst Actress for both her performance in this film and in Striptease. She was also nominated for the same joint award at the 1996 Stinkers Bad Movie Awards but lost to Whoopi Goldberg for Theodore Rex, Eddie, and Bogus. Audiences surveyed by CinemaScore gave the film a grade of "B+" on a scale of A+ to F.

Box office
The film grossed $22.7 million in the United States and Canada and $60 million worldwide, against its $44 million budget.

References

External links
 
 
 
 
 The Juror at Movieweb

1996 films
1990s crime drama films
1990s thriller films
American courtroom films
American crime drama films
American thriller drama films
American thriller films
1990s English-language films
Films directed by Brian Gibson
Films with screenplays by Ted Tally
Films produced by Irwin Winkler
Golden Raspberry Award winning films
Films scored by James Newton Howard
Juries in fiction
Films based on American novels
Films based on crime novels
Films set in Guatemala
Films set in New York (state)
Films shot in New York (state)
Films shot in New Jersey
Films shot in New Mexico
Columbia Pictures films
1996 drama films
1990s American films